Common Field is an American national network of artist-centered organizations and projects. Founded in 2014 by co-founders Elizabeth Chodos, Courtney Fink, Nat May, Stephanie Sherman, Abigail Statinsky, and Shannon Stratton with support from the Andy Warhol Foundation for the Visual Arts, it hosts meet-ups and convenings for artists, organizers, and cultural professionals as an opportunity to share ideas and arts advocacy strategies. Common Field held its first official Convening in Minneapolis, MN in September 2015. In 2016 the convening was held in Miami, Florida, in 2017 it was held in Los Angeles, California and in April 2019 the convening will be held in Philadelphia, PA.

References 

Arts organizations based in California
Arts organizations established in 2014
Non-profit organizations based in California
Advocacy groups in the United States
American artist groups and collectives